Issay Alexandrovich Dobrowen (in Nizhny Novgorod, Russian Empire9 December 1953, Oslo, Norway), born Itschok Zorachovitch Barabeitchik, was a Russian/Soviet-Norwegian pianist, composer and conductor. He left the Soviet Union in 1922 and became a Norwegian citizen in 1929.

Biography
He studied at the Moscow Conservatory, his teachers including Konstantin Igumnov and Sergei Taneyev, graduating with a gold medal. He taught from 1917–1921 at the Moscow Philharmonic Conservatory. He once played Beethoven's Sonata Appassionata for Vladimir Lenin, this sonata being the revolutionary's favorite piece of music. Dobrowen directed the first German performance of Mussorgsky's Boris Godunov (Dresden, 1922). Dobrowen went on to conduct the Oslo Philharmonic orchestra (1928–31), at the Sofia Opera (1927–28), and the San Francisco Symphony (1931–34) and the Gothenburg Symphony (1941–53) orchestras.

Dobrowen worked with both Nikolai Medtner and Artur Schnabel, among other well-known musicians. He was also a close friend of the Russian writer Maxim Gorky, and the Norwegian explorer Fridtjof Nansen. He conducted his last concert with the Oslo Philharmonic in December 1952. His last concert was held on 19 January 1953, when he conducted the Stuttgart Orchestra. He died 9 December 1953 in Oslo at the age of 62.

Compositions
He wrote piano music reminiscent of Sergei Rachmaninoff. Interest in Dobrowen as a composer has started to increase, thanks to a small number of new recording projects, involving the editing and collation of orchestral parts for his Piano Concerto in C minor, Op. 20, which he himself played in a number of countries. As well as the concerto, whose style and orchestration recall Medtner, Rachmaninoff and Alexander Scriabin, three of his piano sonatas and a violin sonata have also appeared on disc in recent times.

References

External links

Issay Dobrowen biography 
Issay Dobrowen biography from Simax

1891 births
1953 deaths
Musicians from Nizhny Novgorod
People from Nizhegorodsky Uyezd
Russian Jews
Soviet emigrants to Norway
Naturalised citizens of Norway
Norwegian people of Russian-Jewish descent
Norwegian classical composers
Norwegian conductors (music)
Jewish classical composers
Jewish classical pianists
Norwegian classical pianists
Russian classical composers
Russian male classical composers
Russian classical pianists
Male classical pianists
Soviet composers
Soviet male composers
Soviet conductors (music)
Soviet classical pianists
20th-century classical pianists
Russian male conductors (music)
20th-century classical composers
Norwegian male pianists
20th-century Russian male musicians